The Men's team épée event of the 2012 World Fencing Championships was contested in Kyiv.

Medalists

Draw

Finals

Top Half

Bottom Half

Placement matches

5–8th place

9–12th place

13–16th place

Final classification

External links
Official results

2012 World Fencing Championships